Amor & Sexo may refer to:
 Amor e Sexo, a Brazilian television series aired on Rede Globo
 Amor y sexo, a 1964 Mexican film